Primovula roseomaculata is a species of sea snail, a marine gastropod mollusk in the family Ovulidae, the ovulids, cowry allies or false cowries.

As is the case in most ovulids, in life, the mantle completely covers the shell almost all of the time.

References

Ovulidae
Gastropods described in 1909